Michael Gaudion (20 June 1938 – 10 August 2021) was an Australian rules footballer who played with North Melbourne in the VFL.

Gaudion was a wingman and played his first two seasons of league football for North Melbourne under his father Charlie who was coach. He went on to appear in 152 games for the club and represented Victoria on occasions during the 1960s.

References

External links

1938 births
2021 deaths
Australian rules footballers from Victoria (Australia)
North Melbourne Football Club players